Friendville may refer to:
 Friendville (manor house), a manor house and estate in the Mannofield area of Aberdeen, Scotland
 Friendville (album), a 2016 album by Jarrod Alonge

See also
Friendsville (disambiguation)